The Devil's Gulch is a 1926 American silent Western film directed by Jack Nelson. The film stars Bob Custer, and Hazel Deane.

Cast
 Bob Custer as Ace and Deuce Remsen
 Hazel Deane as Merrill Waverly
 Charles Belcher as Max Crew
 Pat Beggs as Bill Griggs
 Roy Laidlaw as Seth Waverly
 Mark Hamilton as the Sheriff

References

External links
 

1926 films
American black-and-white films
1926 Western (genre) films
Silent American Western (genre) films
American silent feature films
Films directed by Jack Nelson
1920s American films